Aisha Abimbola (December 19, 1970May 15, 2018) was a Nigerian actress and a Yoruba movie star.

Early life and education 
Abimbola was born in Epe, Lagos State into a Muslim family and later converted to Christianity, the religion she practiced till the time of her death. In a New Telegraph interview, she said her desire to be an actress stopped her from becoming a pastor. She married Victor Ibrahim Musa, and the marriage was blessed with two children.  Aisha attended her secondary education at Ebute Elefun High School and was the Head Girl of the ‘1994 set’.  she later attended Lagos State Polytechnic (LASPOTECH) where she graduated with HND in Catering and Hotel Management. and did her youth service in 2002.

Career 
Abimbola started her journey into the movie industry with Wale Adenuga Production. She walked up to director Antar Laniyan and asked him for a role. Fortunately for her, the director was waiting for one of the casts and the role was given to her. This was like  manna sent down from heaven. She did her best in that role which eventually landed her into more roles. However, a role in the movie Omoge Campus by Bola Igida turned everything around for her. This movie placed her on the stardom of talented actresses in 2001. She easily and talentedly interpreted her roles in indigenous and non-indigenous productions swaying her fans with her skills. At a point in her career, she ventured into movie production with her debut on a movie titled T’omi T’eje in 2016. This was presented in Atlanta and the music was performance by King Rokan.

Selected filmography 
 No Pain
 No Gain
 Awerijaye
 So Wrong So Right
 Omoge Campus
 Kamson and Neighbours

Award
City People Entertainment Award for Yoruba Movie Personality of the Year (2015).

Death 
Abimbola died of breast cancer in a hospital at Canada, aged 47. She had two kids whom her best friend Lola Alao won the custody of after taking the late actress’ husband to court and winning the case.

References

1974 births
2018 deaths
Yoruba actresses
Actresses in Yoruba cinema
Deaths from breast cancer
Deaths from cancer in Canada
Lagos State Polytechnic alumni
Actresses from Lagos State
Nigerian former Muslims
Nigerian Christians
Converts to Christianity from Islam
Nigerian film actresses
21st-century Nigerian actresses
Nigerian media personalities